Anopina desmatana is a moth of the family Tortricidae. It is found in Guerrero, Mexico.

References

Moths described in 1914
desmatana
Moths of Central America